The Men's downhill competition at the 1938 World Championships was held on 5 March 1938.

Results

References

Men's downhill
1938
Engelberg